Marc Brustenga Masagué (born 4 September 1999) is a Spanish cyclist, who currently rides for UCI WorldTeam .

Major results
2017
 1st Prologue (ITT) Ain Bugey Valromey Tour
2021
 1st 
 1st 
 1st 
 1st 
 1st Stage 1 (ITT) Tour of Galicia

References

External links

1999 births
Living people
Spanish male cyclists
Cyclists from Catalonia
People from Vallès Occidental
Sportspeople from the Province of Barcelona
21st-century Spanish people